Alexandre-Marie Guillemin (1817–1880) was a French genre painter. He studied under Antoine-Jean Gros and in 1861 he was awarded the Legion of Honour.

References

1817 births
1880 deaths
19th-century French painters
French male painters
Recipients of the Legion of Honour
19th-century French male artists